The Military Memorial Park is a memorial park at Mount Tiezhan, Dajia District, Taichung, Taiwan.

History
The construction of the park began in July 1958 for its first stage in which the memorial hall was built. The second stage saw the completion of its water plant, electricity plant, pumping station and path for the cemetery. The final stage of the construction was the beautification of the park in which it was completed in April 1960 which included the various plantation of trees. The memorial hall was rebuilt and reopened in January 1987. In January 1996, the Taichung Military Cemetery was renamed to Taichung Military Martyrs' Shrine.

Architecture
The park occupy an area of 2.5 hectares.

Transportation
The park is accessible northeast of Dajia Station of Taiwan Railways.

See also
 List of tourist attractions in Taiwan

References

1958 establishments in Taiwan
Buildings and structures completed in 1958
Buildings and structures in Taichung
Memorial parks in Taiwan